Kaminak (also Romanized as Kamīnak) is a village in Irandegan Rural District, Irandegan District, Khash County, Sistan and Baluchestan Province, Iran. At the 2006 census, its population was 242, in 51 families.

References 

Populated places in Khash County